Oak Street is a short street in Chicago's Gold Coast neighborhood, adjacent to North Michigan Avenue. Because the street houses the highest concentration of luxury  brands, "Oak Street" also designates the surrounding area including Rush Street and Walton Street as Chicago's upscale retail district.

Location
Oak Street is in Chicago's Gold Coast. It runs from 138 East to 650 West in the Near North Side. It ends without crossing the North Branch of the Chicago River. West of the river, the street changes to Augusta Boulevard. Its eastern end is Michigan Avenue. At this intersection Oak Street becomes East Lake Shore Drive. Two blocks east of this end are famed North Lake Shore Drive, Lakefront Trail, and Oak Street Beach.

Points of interest
Oak Street is Chicago's most prestigious shopping street. Oak Street has a mix of international couture houses, American luxury brands, fashion brands, and local boutiques. It intersects the  Michigan Avenue at its east end. Oak Street contains more high end international brands than Michigan Avenue, although it is perceived as an extension, if not part, of the Magnificent Mile. However, in contrast to Michigan Avenue, Oak Street is much narrower, with trees lining both sides of the block giving a more intimate setting, with less foot traffic. Due to the short length of the street, new shops have overflowed onto the intersecting Rush Street.

Brands in the shopping district
These brands have  stores on Oak St or nearby on Walton St or Rush St:  Athleta, Buccellati, Bonpoint,  Brunello Cucinelli, Calypso St Barth, Carolina Herrera, Chanel, Christofle, Giorgio Armani, Escada, Eskandar, Furla, Christian Louboutin, COS, Dior, Georg Jensen, George Greene, Graff Diamonds, Hermès, Harry Winston, Jimmy Choo,  Dolce & Gabbana, Le Labo, Loro Piana,  Maje/Sandro, Moncler, Paul Stuart, Piazza Sempione, Prada,  Saint Laurent, Sararose, Shinola, Suitsupply, Ted Baker, Tod's, Tom Ford, Van Cleef and Arpels, Versace, Vera Wang,   and Wolford.

See also
List of shopping streets and districts by city
Rush Street
Fifth Avenue

References

External links 
Oak Street Chicago

Oak Street
Shopping districts and streets in the United States